{{Infobox Boxingmatch
| fight date    = November 19, 2016
| Fight Name    = Pound for Pound
| image         = 
| location      = T-Mobile Arena, Paradise, Nevada, U.S.
| fighter1      = Sergey Kovalev
| nickname1     = Krusher
| record1       = 30–0–1 (26 KO)
| hometown1     = Kopeysk, Chelyabinsk Oblast, Russia
| height1       = 6 feet
| weight1       = 175 lbs
| style1        = Orthodox
| recognition1  = WBA (Undisputed), IBF, and WBO light heavyweight champion[[The Ring (magazine)|The Ring]] No. 2 ranked pound-for-pound fighter
| fighter2      = Andre Ward
| nickname2     = S.O.G.
| record2       = 30–0 (15 KO)
| hometown2     = Oakland, California, U.S.
| height2       = 6 feet
| Referee       =
| weight2       = 175 lbs
| style2        = Orthodox
| recognition2  = The Ring No. 4 ranked pound-for-pound fighterFormer unified super middleweight champion
| titles        =  WBA (Undisputed), IBF, and WBO light heavyweight titles
| result        = Ward wins via 12-round unanimous decision (114-113, 114-113, 114-113)
}}
Sergey Kovalev vs. Andre Ward, billed as Pound for Pound, was a highly anticipated professional boxing superfight for the unified WBA (Undisputed), IBF, and WBO light heavyweight titles. The bout was held on November 19, 2016, at the T-Mobile Arena in Las Vegas, Nevada. The event was televised on HBO Pay-per-view. Ward won the fight by unanimous decision to take the titles.

Background
Entering the fight, Kovalev, the unified light heavyweight champion, was ranked No. 2 in The Ring's pound-for-pound top 10 rankings and Ward, the former unified super middleweight champion, was ranked No. 4.  In anticipation of the victor being acclaimed the sport's best pound-for-pound fighter, the promoters dubbed the fight simply "Pound for Pound."

This was just the third bout between two undefeated fighters rated in The Ring's pound-for-pound top 5 since the magazine began its pound-for-pound rankings in 1989.  The previous two were 1990's Julio Cesar Chavez vs. Meldrick Taylor bout and 1999's matchup between Oscar De La Hoya and Felix Trinidad.

Fight details
Unified light heavyweight champion Sergey Kovalev fought Andre Ward at the T-Mobile Arena on November 19, 2016. The fight was announced in June, and both fighters retained their undefeated records through interim bouts. This event marked Ward's first time fighting in Las Vegas. Ward had a few rough opening rounds, and was knocked down in the second by a hard right from Kovalev. After being knocked down in the second round, he won a controversial unanimous decision with all three judges scoring the fight 114-113 in favor of Ward.

Final CompuBox numbers

En route to losing the controversial unanimous decision, it was indeed Kovalev who threw and landed more punches:

Post-fight reaction
Ward described his victory as "the most important and satisfying" of his career and argued, "The crowd, you could hear they thought I won."  Despite being knocked down for just the second time in his career, Ward denied ever being hurt by Kovalev and felt his own effectiveness at midrange and on the inside "made all the difference" in the fight.  He also stated his willingness to grant Kovalev a rematch.  Virgil Hunter, Ward's trainer, contended Ward won because he "landed the cleaner punches" and Kovalev "was aggressive but not effective."

Kovalev denounced Ward's win as the "wrong decision" and suggested the three judges, all Americans, were biased in favor of Ward.  Commentator Larry Merchant agreed, labeling it a "classic hometown decision." Kathy Duva, Kovalev's promoter, called it "a bad decision," criticized referee Robert Byrd for failing to control Ward's "wrestling" tactics, and vowed to exercise Kovalev's contractual right to an immediate rematch.  Duva conceded that the fight was "close" and did not believe the nationality of the judges affected the outcome.

Thomas Hauser concurred with Duva's criticisms of Byrd and deemed "Byrd's refereeing ... more problematic than the judging." Viewing it "a difficult fight to score" with "a lot of close rounds," Hauser scored the fight 115-113 for Kovalev but found the 114-113 scores in Ward's favor "within the realm of reason."

George Willis of the New York Post praised the fight for living up to expectations, rejected claims the decision amounted to a "robbery," and noted that all three judges "had virtually the same scores...from the best seats in the house."  Liam Happe of Yahoo! Sports echoed those sentiments, writing the fight was a "a thrilling war" in which boxing fans "got their money's worth" and that "it wasn't daylight robbery, at all" despite his personal scorecard favoring Kovalev by a point.  Scott Christ of Bad Left Hook, who scored the fight 115-112 for Kovalev, considered it a "tough [fight] to score, with plenty of rounds that could have gone either way" and characterized it as a "debatable" decision rather than a "robbery."

In the aftermath of the fight, The Ring elevated Ward from No. 4 to No. 2 in its pound-for-pound rankings, behind No. 1 Roman "Chocolatito" Gonzalez, and dropped Kovalev one spot to No. 3.  Ward also supplanted Kovalev as the magazine's No. 1 ranked light heavyweight, with Kovalev falling to No. 2.

Financial details
The champion Kovalev received a minimum purse of $2 million and stood to earn a percentage of the profits from his promoter, Main Events. The challenger Ward's purse was a career-high $5 million.

Kovalev–Ward was broadcast on HBO pay-per-view in the United States and generated 165,000 buys, a number seen as "disappointing" for a fight of its magnitude.  It was the first appearance for either Kovalev or Ward headlining a pay-per-view bout and faced competition from the Manny Pacquiao vs. Jessie Vargas pay-per-view fight card earlier in November.

Unofficial media scorecards
EditorialAssociated Press: 116–111, KovalevLas Vegas Review-Journal: 116–112, Kovalev
ESPN: 115–112, KovalevThe Guardian: 115–112, KovalevBoxing Monthly: 114–113, KovalevLos Angeles Times: 114–113, WardNew York Post: 114–113, WardThe Ring: 114–113, WardUSA Today: 114–113, Ward
Yahoo! Sports: 114–113, Ward

Journalists and commentators
Harold Lederman, HBO Sports: 116–111, Kovalev
Thomas Hauser, The Sweet Science: 115–113, Kovalev
Stephen A. Smith, ESPN: 114–113 Kovalev
Max Kellerman, HBO Sports: 114–113, Kovalev
Tony Bellew, Sky Sports: 114–114
Paulie Malignaggi, Sky Sports: 116–112, Ward
Paul Smith, Sky Sports: 116–113, Ward
Matthew Macklin, Sky Sports: 115–113, Ward
Branson Wright, The Plain Dealer'': 114–113, Ward
Rick Evans, Boxingtalk.com: 114-113, Ward

Fight card
Light heavyweight: Sergey Kovalev vs. Andre Ward
Light welterweight: Maurice Hooker vs. Darleys Pérez
Light heavyweight: Oleksandr Gvozdyk vs. Isaac Chilemba
Middleweight: Curtis Stevens vs. James de la Rosa

International broadcasting

See also
 Andre Ward vs. Sergey Kovalev II

References

External links
 Sergey Kovalev's career boxing record
 Andre Ward's career boxing record
 Sergey Kovalev vs. Andre Ward at HBO

Boxing matches
2016 in boxing
Boxing in Las Vegas
Events in Paradise, Nevada
Boxing on HBO
2016 in sports in Nevada
November 2016 sports events in the United States